Dean A. Stoecker (born 1956/1957) is an American businessman, and the co-founder (in 1997), chairman and former CEO (19972020) of Alteryx, a computer software company.

Stoecker was born and grew up in Colorado. His family is from Boulder, Colorado, where his "father was an entrepreneur who built A-Frame houses", and Dean was the youngest child.

He earned a bachelor's degree from the University of Colorado, and an MBA from Pepperdine University.

In August 2019, Forbes assessed Stoecker's net worth at $1.2 billion, following Alteryx's near 900% share price rise since its 2017 IPO.

He was a district-level delegate to the 2016 Republican National Convention from California.

He is married to Angie. They live in Irvine, California.

References

Living people
American billionaires
American company founders
American chief executives
1950s births
University of Colorado Boulder alumni
Pepperdine University alumni
People from Boulder, Colorado
People from Irvine, California